Gutenbergia is a genus of African flowering plants in the daisy family.

 Species

References

Vernonieae
Flora of Africa
Asteraceae genera